The Global Electronic Music Marketplace (GEMM) was an online music trading website established in 1994. It was founded by CEO/COO Roger Raffee and Jim Hall, and based in La Jolla, California, United States. Most of the items traded on the site were used CDs and LPs. As of February 2016 the site is defunct.

Between 1996 and 2001, GEMM was the largest online music marketplace, with a sales and revenue yearly growth rate of 100% and 11 employees. By 2002, the site's inventory had grown from 250,000 to 16 million items. Similarly to trading sites such as eBay, GEMM included a five-star vendor rating system based on buyer feedback, as well as advanced search features and custom user want-lists.

GEMM filed for bankruptcy and ceased business operations effective July 8th, 2015.

See also
Discogs

References

Online marketplaces of the United States
American music websites
American companies established in 1994
Internet properties established in 1994
Internet properties disestablished in 2015
Companies based in San Diego
1994 establishments in California